The Khnov bilingual epitaph refers to a late 14th-century epitaph inscribed on a trapezoid-shaped headstone stele, which was discovered in the mountainous village of Khnov in Dagestan, Russia. The inscription consists of a six-line Arabic prose text dated Rajab 784 AH (September–October 1382 AD) followed by a four-line Persian metrical text containing the three dobayts from the Matlūb kull tālib treatise of Iranian poet Rashid al-Din Vatvat (died 1182/3). According to the Iranologist Grigol Beradze, the Khnov bilingual epitaph represents the "earliest dated Persian poetical inscription to be found so far in the North Caucasus".

References

Funerary steles
History of Dagestan
Persian inscriptions
Arabic inscriptions
Archaeological discoveries in Russia
14th-century inscriptions
14th-century sculptures
Multilingual texts